The Lockyer Valley Region is a local government area in the West Moreton region of South East Queensland, Australia, between the cities of Ipswich and Toowoomba. It was created in 2008 from a merger of the Shire of Gatton and the Shire of Laidley. It has an estimated operating budget of A$35m.

History 

Prior to European settlement, the Lockyer Valley area was home to the Kitabul Aboriginal people.

Tarampa Division, as it was then known, was created on 15 January 1880 under the Divisional Boards Act 1879, with its first board meeting being held on 20 February 1880. On 25 April 1888, the Laidley district broke away and separately incorporated as the Laidley Division, and later on 25 January 1890, the Forest Hill area moved from Tarampa to Laidley. On 1 July 1902, the town of Laidley was created as a separate municipality with its own Borough Council.

With the passage of the Local Authorities Act 1902, the borough and divisions became a town and shires respectively on 31 March 1903. The town council was dissolved on 8 February 1917, and Laidley absorbed part of the Shire of Rosewood.

On 3 September 1938, Tarampa was renamed the Shire of Gatton. On 19 March 1949 it grew to incorporate part of the former Shires of Drayton and Highfields, while losing some of its original area to the City of Toowoomba and Shire of Crows Nest.

In July 2007, the Local Government Reform Commission released its report and recommended that Gatton and Laidley amalgamate, uniting the major farming, cropping and horticultural production area of South East Queensland under one local authority. While both councils opposed the amalgamation, they identified each other as preferred partners if it had to go ahead. On 15 March 2008, the two Shires formally ceased to exist, and elections were held on the same day to elect six councillors and a mayor to the Lockyer Valley Regional Council.

After the deadly 2010–11 Queensland floods, which destroyed the town of Grantham, the council responded quickly to relocate the town to non-flood prone land.  The council purchased freehold land adjoining the existing town for the voluntary resettlement of eligible residents.  To speed the recovery process normal land use planning procedures were dropped although there was a public consultation period. Support from the state government was muted, partly because the new urban development was contrary to the South East Queensland Regional Plan.

Wards
The council remains undivided and its elected body consists of six councillors and a mayor, elected for a four-year term.

Towns and localities

The Lockyer Valley Region includes the following settlements:

Gatton area:
 Gatton
 Adare
 Blanchview
 College View
 Fordsdale
 Grantham
 Helidon
 Iredale
 Junction View
 Lake Clarendon
 Lawes
 Lower Tenthill
 Ma Ma Creek
 Murphys Creek
 Placid Hills
 Ropeley
 Thornton
 Upper Tenthill
 Veradilla
 Winwill
 Withcott
 Woodlands

Laidley area:
 Laidley
 Blenheim
 Forest Hill
 Glenore Grove
 Regency Downs
 Hatton Vale
 Kentville
 Laidley Heights
 Lockrose
 Mulgowie
 Plainland

Other areas:
 Ballard
 Black Duck Creek
 Brightview1
 Buaraba South
 Caffey
 Carpendale
 Churchable
 Crowley Vale
 Derrymore
 East Haldon
 Egypt
 Fifteen Mile
 Flagstone Creek
 Glen Cairn
 Helidon Spa

 Ingoldsby
 Kensington Grove
 Laidley Creek West
 Laidley North
 Laidley South
 Lefthand Branch
 Lilydale
 Lockyer
 Lockyer Waters
 Lynford
 Morton Vale
 Mount Berryman
 Mount Sylvia
 Mount Whitestone
 Postmans Ridge
 Preston

 Ringwood
 Rockmount
 Rockside
 Seventeen Mile
 Silver Ridge
 Spring Creek
 Stockyard
 Summerholm
 Townson
 Upper Flagstone
 Upper Lockyer
 Vinegar Hill
 West Haldon
 White Mountain
 Woodbine

1 - split with Somerset Region

Population

Prior to 2008, the populations given relate to the previous component entities. The 2011 census marks the first for the region to be recorded as a single area.

Mayors
Steve Jones, former mayor of Gatton, was elected as first mayor of the Lockyer Valley Region.
 2008–2016: Steve Jones, died in office on 20 February 2016
 2016–present: Tanya Lee-Anne Milligan

Libraries 
The Lockyer Valley Region Council provide public libraries in Gatton and Laidley.

Sister City Relations 

  Ageo, Japan, since July 2014

References

External links

 
Lockyer Valley
2008 establishments in Australia